Bushehr Marine Rangers Battalion is one of the Iranian Navy's Commando units. The battalion has an important operational role in the early months of the Iran-Iraq War and a prominent role in the Liberation of Khorramshahr.

Operation Morvarid
During the Operation Morvarid in Iran-Iraq War, the "Bushehr Marine Rangers Battalion" played a prominent role in capture and destruction of two Iraqi docks, "Al-Bakr" and "Al-Amiyah".

Defending Khorramshahr
In Iran-Iraq War, "Boushehr Marine Rangers Battalion" arrived in Khorramshahr on 22 September 1980, with about 700 personnel. Khorramshahr was finally occupied by Iraqi Army on 26 October 1980, after 34 days of resistance and street fighting against those. In the morning of 26 October 1980, after helping people to evacuate the city, the "Boushehr Marine Rangers Battalion" personnel were the last to leave the city by boat. In the battle for defense of Khorramshahr, 300 people were injured and 76 were killed only from "Boushehr Marine Rangers Battalion" personnel.

Gallery

See also
 Operation Morvarid
 Hooshang Samadi
 Mohammad Ali Safa
 Iran–Iraq War
 Liberation of Khorramshahr
 Battle of Khorramshahr
 Siege of Abadan

References

External links
 Photos of Navy Rangers of Iran Army 
 Interview with Hooshang Samadi and his picture 

Islamic Republic of Iran Navy
Special forces of Iran